Aporrhais pesgallinae is a species of medium-sized sea snail, a marine gastropod mollusc in the family Aporrhaidae, the pelican's foot snails or pelican's foot shells.

Distribution
Found along the coast of west Africa in the South Atlantic Ocean.

References

Aporrhaidae